Edward Heneage (21 July 1775 – 7 October 1810) was an English first-class cricketer who played for Surrey in one first-class match in 1796, totalling 3 runs with a highest score of 3.

Heneage was born in London and died in Lisbon, aged 35, during the Peninsular War.

References

Bibliography
 

English cricketers
English cricketers of 1787 to 1825
Surrey cricketers
1775 births
1810 deaths